Major Archer Paterson Denness MC, (26 December 1914 – 12 September 1997) was an Australian Army officer who served during the Second World War and the Korean War.

Personal life
Denness was born 26 December 1914 in Fremantle, Western Australia. He married Jessie Elma Brown on 23 November 1946 at Orange, New South Wales. She was born 12 August 1916, Gunnedah or Coonabarabran, New South Wales and was an Army Nurse during the Second World War. The couple had three children, (Helen, Ian and Janice), and 11 grandchildren. Archer died in Temora, New South Wales on 12 September 1997, and Jessie on 13 April 2006.

Military career
Following the outbreak of the Second World War Denness enlisted in the Second Australian Imperial Force in 1940, listing his pre-service occupation as a butcher. In 1941, after undertaking officer training, he was commissioned with the rank of lieutenant and assigned to the 2/32nd Battalion, of the 9th Division, serving with them during the North African campaign and then later in New Guinea after they were brought back to fight against the Japanese. In 1944 he received a Mentioned in Despatches for his service while deployed. 

Following the end of the war, Denness transferred to the 66th Battalion and deployed to Japan as part of the British Commonwealth Occupation Force, where he commanded the battalion's 'B' Company, carrying out a number of operations including a search raid on the village of Kinoe where Denness' company discovered a contraband smuggling vessel. In 1948, however, he returned to Australia and after being discharged on 26 May, he was placed on the Reserve of Officers list.

Following the outbreak of the Korean War, Denness returned to the active list and was assigned to the 3rd Battalion, Royal Australian Regiment. While in command of 'C' Company he took part in the Battle of Yongju in Korea, for which he was later awarded the Military Cross. In July 1951, Denness briefly commanded 3RAR between the departure of Lieutenant Colonel Bruce Ferguson and the arrival of the new commanding officer, Lieutenant Colonel Frank Hassett. 

He retired in 1960.

Military Cross citation
DENNESS, Archer Patterson, Captain (2/400335), 
3rd Battalion, Royal Australian Regiment, 1950

Notes

References

 
 
 
 

1914 births
1997 deaths
Australian Army personnel of World War II
Australian military personnel of the Korean War
Recipients of the Military Cross
People from Perth, Western Australia
Australian Army officers